Felicio Ramuth (born 11 November 1968) is a Brazilian politician who has served as Vice Governor of São Paulo under Governor Tarcísio de Freitas since 2023. Elected in the 2022 gubernatorial election, Ramuth previously served as Mayor of São José dos Campos from 2017 to 2022. Ramuth was a member of the Brazilian Social Democracy Party (PSDB) until 2022, when he joined the Social Democratic Party (PSD).

Early life and education 
Ramuth was born 11 November 1968 in the city of São Paulo. Ramuth received an education in business administration, graduating with an MBA in Public Management from Fundação Getulio Vargas.

Mayor of São José dos Campos 
From January 2017 to March 2022, he served as mayor of São José dos Campos, the fifth most populous city in the state São Paulo. He was first elected mayor in the 2016 municipal election with 62% of the vote, and was reelected in 2020 with 58.21% of the vote. Prior to serving as mayor, he served as secretary of transport and as communication planning advisor for mayor .

Vice Governor of São Paulo 
Ramuth left the Brazilian Social Democracy Party (PSDB) in 2022. Felício Ramuth had initially planned to run for Governor of São Paulo in the 2022 gubernatorial election as the nominee of the PSD. However, he ultimately ran for Vice Governor on a successful ticket headed by Tarcísio de Freitas of the Republicanos.

Personal life 
Ramuth is Jewish.

References 

|-

Living people
Brazilian Social Democracy Party politicians
Social Democratic Party (Brazil, 2011) politicians
Brazilian Jews
1968 births